British Petrol may refer to:

 British petrol, any petrol (gasoline) produced or owned by British companies
 British Petroleum Company, now called just BP
 British Petrol, an oil tanker in the fleet of the British Tanker Company